Diastictus is a genus of beetles belonging to the subfamily Aphodiinae.

The species of this genus are found in Europe.

Species:
 Diastictus vulneratus (Sturm, 1805)

References

Scarabaeidae
Scarabaeidae genera